Dorkbot is a group of affiliated organizations worldwide that sponsor grassroots meetings of artists, engineers, designers, scientists, inventors, and anyone else working under the very broad umbrella of electronic art. The dorkbot motto is "people doing strange things with electricity".

Started by Douglas Repetto at the Columbia University Computer Music Center in 2000, dorkbot spread around the world, with over 100 chapters either planning or actively holding meetings as of 2010. In 2012, a series of viruses with the same name appeared and it caused many of the chapters to disband.

The purpose of dorkbot meetings is to nurture a local electronic arts community and to encourage emerging, and established, artists to present new works for informal peer review.  While many of the dorkbot groups hold their meetings at universities and students are encouraged to attend, dorkbot meetings are not restricted in any way to the academic community.  Dorkbot groups encourage the free exchange of ideas on the electronic arts, and regular attendees of one dorkbot will often visit another when they are travelling, serving as informal ambassadors between groups.

See also
 ArtBots
 Café Scientifique
 Hackspace
 Maker Faire
 Nerd Nite

References

External links
 Dorkbot Main Page
 Footage of NYC Dorkbot events
 "Questions about self-organisation: Dorkbot" interview with Repetto for Pixelache 2008 Helsinki festival
 "Technical Knock-Outs" by Ben Davis, Artnet Magazine
 Dorkbot PDX

Art festivals
Organizations established in 2000
New media art festivals
Festival organizations
New media art
Digital art
Hacker culture
Digital media organizations
Political art
Politics and technology